Tall Hours in the Glowstream is the third album by Cotton Jones, which was released on August 24, 2010.  Michael Nau and Whitney McGraw recorded the majority of the album in their living room while they were staying in Winterville, Georgia, and the sound of the record is equal parts gospel, Southern soul, and backwoods folk. The album is an evolution from the Southern Gothic nocturnal vibes of The River Strumming and the moody, misty psychedelic folk of Paranoid Cocoon into a brighter, shimmering baroque pop similar in spirit to their contemporaries Fleet Foxes.

Track listing

References

External links
 Head Heritage review
SuicideSqueeze.net

Suicide Squeeze Records albums
2010 albums
Cotton Jones albums